Janet World Tour (stylized as janet. World Tour) was the second concert tour by American singer, performer, songwriter and dancer Janet Jackson. It was launched in support of her fifth studio album Janet (1993). It began in November 1993 and continued through April 1995. Concerts were held in North America, Europe, Asia, and Australia. It is believed shows were performed in South America. However, there are not exact details and most information is unknown.

Jackson's 1990 tour made history as the most successful debut concert tour in history. Like its predecessor, this tour became known for its theatrical grandeur—incorporating complex choreography, pyrotechnics, video display, stage design, and costuming—drawing comparison to Broadway theatre. Jackson visited four continents and eighteen countries within the span of 17 months. The tour had 125 dates and is the most shows Jackson has done for any concert. The show received positive reviews, and a number of reviews observed her showmanship had improved. The shows in North America, in 1994, earned $18.1 million.

Development
Costumes and wardrobe for the tour were designed by stylist Tanya Gill, with outfits "rang[ing] from pipebone vests with high-heeled moccasin boots to zoot suits top-hats to circus-ringmaster bustiers." With a show encompassing over 100 costumes, a team of over 50 costume makers was led by wardrobe supervisor Helen Hiatt.

Promotion
MTV promoted the Janet World Tour with a one-hour special in Jackson's honor, "hosted by MTV VJs Bill Bellamy and John Norris, [which featured] performance highlights, interviews with Jackson and her dancers, and behind-the-scenes production and rehearsal footage." MTV publicist Jennifer Barner stated the channel wanted to give extensive coverage to Jackson's opening concert in Cincinnati, "because it is such a big tour and she's really, really hot now." Despite heavy anticipation for the tour, news media were discouraged from attending opening night, which was seen as a dress rehearsal. A spokeswoman for the tour stated "[w]e really don't want a lot of out-of-town media" even though music critic Rick Bird observed "[n]ormally, such an important tour opening would be attended by pop-music media and paparazzi from around the world. However, Bird also noted a low-key premiere was a strategic move for Jackson and her management, "since the complicated high-tech dance show will likely have some bugs to be worked out before it plays in larger media centers. And, given the adverse publicity the Jackson family is facing these days, the low-key opening night may indeed be the best strategy."

Concert Synopsis

Critical reception

Prior to the tour's launch, the Los Angeles Sentinel commented on the anticipation surrounding Jackson's return, stating: "Her first-ever concert tour in 1990 was the most successful premiere tour by any artist in pop music history. And now, amid great anticipation, Janet Jackson is set to return to the concert trail with her world tour in connection with her already triple platinum-plus 'janet' album ... The tour promises to be an innovative feast of sight and sound, a theatrical experience with spectacular choreography, staging and lighting." Lenny Stoute in the Toronto Star gave a positive review to her performance at the SkyDome in Toronto, Ontario, Canada, stating that "as she'd done with the tour opener in Cincinnati Wednesday, it was a superb production that came with an emotional subtext." Commenting on the highly athletic and sexually provocative performances of such songs as "If", "What Have You Done for Me Lately" and "Nasty", he states: "This pelvic-thrusting, butt-wiggling, lip-licking high-energy temptress is a long way from the cute 'n' chubby girl next door of her previous Rhythm Nation tour. And she came equipped with the tough dance moves, firm muscles and seven costume changes to emphasize the difference."

In December 1993, Jackson had a five-day engagement in New York City at Madison Square Garden, which saw its last concert on New Year's Eve. Jon Pareles of The New York Times stated: "The video-age arena spectacle is in good hands with Janet Jackson. Her current tour, which started a four-night run at Madison Square Garden on Friday night, piles on the production values: music, dancers, costumes, moving sets, video, lights, fireworks, everything but confetti and balloons." He criticized the fact that the concert seemed overtly calculated, leaving little room for spontaneity. However, he compared her musical diversity favorably to other pop icons such as Prince, Madonna and her brother Michael. In reference to her vocal capabilities, Pareles comments that "[l]ike many other video-promoted singers, Ms. Jackson doesn't have a big voice ... But Ms. Jackson is a stronger vocalist than she was when she last toured, three years ago."

According to Andy Smith of the Providence Journal, "Jackson and company created a sensory overload of lights, dancers, video, fireworks, explosions, costumes and sets ... The music was competently performed, but this was a concert for the age of MTV, more satisfying to the eye than the ear." Although he believed she gave a well-performed production, he felt she lacked the stage presence of rivals such as Madonna and Tina Turner. Greg Kot of Rolling Stone wrote: "If a performance can be faulted for being too well-rehearsed and too tautly paced, this was certainly an example ... Small of voice and slight of stature, Jackson seems more at home in a Fame-style ensemble than she does as a larger-than-life performer. Yet it's exactly that quality that makes her so endearing. Despite her impressive string of musical successes, Jackson still acts like the members of her audience." Roberta Fusaro of the Telegram & Gazette, who reviewed her performance at The Centrum stated that Jackson "has shown incredible improvement as a performer since her Rhythm Nation tour ... specifically her dancing and her working of the crowd. She still lacks some of the spontaneity that could raise the level of her concerts from good ones to damn memorable ones, but Janet seemed pretty comfortable on stage last night in front of an all-forgiving near sold-out crowd, commanding the boards like a cross between Tina Turner and Madonna at some points."

In reviewing her concert at the San Jose Arena, Michael Snyder of the San Francisco Chronicle wrote: "That once-blurry line between stadium-size pop music concerts and full-scale theatrical extravaganzas ... is completely eradicated." Citing her tightly choreographed performance, Snyder comments "[h]er theatrical inclinations elevated the concert at San Jose, but some of the music was truncated in the service of the production." Giving his opinion that Jackson proved to be a better performer than a singer, he likened her concert to productions by Broadway theatre and Cirque du Soleil.
Karla Peterson of The San Diego Union-Tribune remarked: "Expertly designed, energetically choreographed, and engagingly performed by the large group of musicians and dancers, the 100-minute show ... had everything you'd expect from a pop pro of Jackson's stature." Despite criticism that the show appeared overly structured, Peterson expressed: "To criticize Janet Jackson for cranking out a pre-programmed block of hits is like criticizing a cat for sleeping all day. It is simply what she does, and with the exception of Madonna, Jackson does this high-concept schtick better than anybody. She is a sharp dancer, an appealing performer, and as "That's the Way Love Goes" proves—an ace pop-song writer." Renee Graham of The Boston Globe commented that "Jackson is not so much a singer as a performer and entertainer, more concerned with the visual presentation than scintillating vocals."

Miscellaneous
Pioneer signed contracts with many major music artists, including Janet, to release their concerts exclusively on Laserdisc. To date, the contracts are still standing and the concerts have not been released on DVD by Pioneer or others. As a result, the tour has never been released on home video. The tour has aired on television, although it has never aired in full. MTV covered the opening night of the tour as well as the European leg.
Janet plans to release the "Janet. World Tour", as well as the "Rhythm Nation 1814 World Tour", on DVD or package it with an upcoming studio album in the near future.
Janet performed two concerts at Radio City Music Hall to benefit the Rwandan crisis. The shows were also recorded for a television special that never aired. The concert special was directed and filmed by her then-husband Rene Elizondo, Jr.
"Come Back to Me", "What'll I Do", and "Where are You Now" were only performed on the first few dates of the tour before being cut from the setlist. "And On and On" was only performed at select shows during the third leg of the tour. "Black Cat" and "This Time" were exclusively performed during the first leg in North America.
During each show, one of these three songs would be performed as the last song of each concert. "Because Of Love" was performed on the first, second, and third legs in North America and Japan; "You Want This" was performed on the fourth and fifth legs in North America, Australia, and Asia; and "Whoops Now" was performed on the sixth leg in Europe.
The "Janet. World Tour" spanned 18 countries in 17 months, and marked the first time Janet performed in Australia and in South Asia.
Janet's show at the Dean Smith Center in Chapel Hill, North Carolina had to be canceled when the venue board refused to grant a permit allowing the fireworks and chemicals used to create the show's effects.
Janet had to postpone the concert in Worcester, Massachusetts twice, and finally a date was set on Super Bowl Sunday. As an apology for scheduling the show on the day of the Super Bowl XXVIII, Janet screened the game on her four Jumbotrons before she took the stage.
Janet Jackson took ill 40 minutes into her Salt Lake City concert. She was treated at a hospital emergency room for what was reported to be "flu-like symptoms and dehydration."
In Kansas City, city organizers offered a gun-control program in which guns were swapped for cash and other much sought-after items, including tickets to the tour.
Janet was the first pop artist to perform at the MGM Grand Garden Special Events Center in 1994.
Multiple bootleg recordings of the tour have surfaced:
 Sex is Happiness CD Live in Minneapolis on December 2, 1993.
 Live in Peoria, Illinois on February 6, 1994.
 Jones Beach New York June 27, 1994.
 Jones Beach New York June 28, 1994.
 Live in Rotterdam, Netherlands at The Ahoy on March 21, 1995.
 Live in Barcelona Spain on March 26, 1995.
 Clips live in Australia performing "If"
 Clips live in the Philippines performing "If"
 Clips live in Tokyo, Japan "If"

The band
Musical Director: Rex Salas
Keyboards: Rex Salas
Drums: Jonathan Moffett, John Roberts
Keyboards: Eric Daniels, Brian Simpson
Percussion: Terry Santiel
Guitar: David Barry
Bass: Sam Sims
Background vocals: Stacy Campbell, Romeo Johnson, and Lisa Taylor
Choreographer: Tina Landon
Dancers: Tina Landon, Sean Cheesman, Cynthia Davila, Shawnette Heard, Omar Lopez, Tish Oliver, Jennifer Lopez , Kelly Konno, Nikki Pantenburg, Jossie Harris , Tam Jo 
Source:

Opening acts
Tony! Toni! Toné! 
Mint Condition 
MC Lyte 
Tevin Campbell 
Kulcha 
MN8 
Bill Bellamy

Setlist
The following setlist was obtained from the concert held on April 17, 1994; at the America West Arena in Phoenix, Arizona. It does not represent all concerts for the duration of the tour. 

"If"
"What Have You Done for Me Lately" / "Nasty"
"Let's Wait Awhile" / "Come Back to Me"
"Throb"
"When I Think of You" / "Escapade" / "Miss You Much"
"Love Will Never Do (Without You)"
"Alright"
"What'll I Do"
"Any Time, Any Place"
"Again"
"Black Cat"
"Rhythm Nation"
Encore
"This Time"
"That's the Way Love Goes"
"Because of Love"

Notes
Other songs performed at various shows during the tour include: "Where Are You Now", "And On and On", "New Agenda", "You Want This" and "Whoops Now".

Tour dates

Box office score data

Notes

References 

Janet Jackson concert tours
1993 concert tours
1994 concert tours
1995 concert tours